679 is a year of the Christian or Common Era.

679 may also refer to:

679 (number), the number
679 (song), a 2015 song by Fetty Wap